Nebria caucasica is a species of ground beetle from the Nebriinae subfamily that is endemic to Caucasus.

References

External links
Nebria caucasica at Carabidae of the World

caucasica
Beetles described in 1832
Beetles of Asia